Pirum gemmata is a unicellular eukaryote that belongs to the Ichthyosporea clade, a group of protists closely related to animals. P. gemmata was isolated from the gut contents of a marine invertebrate, specifically the detritivorous peanut worm Phascolosoma agassizii.

P. gemmata’s growth under culture conditions, is through the development of a mature syncytial stage that undergoes sporogenesis and eventually releases endospores through one or more openings in the parent cell wall. Mature cells are multinucleated, with a cell wall, and can measure up to 200 μm. Endospores are amoeboid and some have pseudopod-like cell extensions.

Taxonomy 
P. gemmata is a member of the Ichthyosporea clade, which is the earliest branching holozoan lineage.

Applications 
P. gemmata can easily be cultured axenically in marine broth medium. Given its phylogenetic position as a close unicellular relative of animals, P. gemmata could potentially provide important insights into the origin of multicellular animals.

References 

Mesomycetozoea